Riaan Vermeulen (born 3 August 1984) is a South African rugby union player.

References

South African rugby union players
Living people
1984 births
Rugby union props
Rugby union players from the Eastern Cape
Free State Cheetahs players